Qaleh Juq (also Romanized as Qal‘eh Jūq) is a village in Qaranqu Rural District, in the Central District of Hashtrud County, East Azerbaijan Province, Iran. At the 2006 census, its population was 22, in 5 families.

References 

Towns and villages in Hashtrud County